Coleorozena longicollis is a species of case-bearing leaf beetle in the family Chrysomelidae. It has one subspecies. It is found in North America.

Subspecies
Coleorozena longicollis longicollis (Jacoby, 1888)

References 

Clytrini
Beetles of North America
Beetles described in 1888